National Highway 965G, commonly referred to as NH 965G is a national highway in  India. It is a spur road of National Highway 65. NH-965G traverses the state of Maharashtra in India.

Route 

Patas, Baramati, Indapur, Akluj, Velapur, Sangola, Bhalwani, Kadlas, Jat.

Junctions  
 
  Terminal near Patas.
  Terminal near Jat.

See also 

 List of National Highways in India
 List of National Highways in India by state

References

External links 

 NH 965G on OpenStreetMap

National highways in India
National Highways in Maharashtra